The 2014–15 Premier League (known as the Barclays Premier League for sponsorship reasons) was the 23rd season of the Premier League, the top English professional league for association football clubs, since its establishment in 1992, and the 116th season of top-flight English football overall. The fixtures were announced on 18 June 2014.	
The season started on 16 August 2014 and concluded on 24 May 2015.

Manchester City came into the season as defending champions of the 2013–14 season. Leicester City, Burnley and Queens Park Rangers entered as the three promoted teams.

On 3 May 2015, Chelsea won the title with three games to spare after a 1–0 home win over Crystal Palace. It was their first league title since 2010, their fourth Premier League title and their fifth English league title overall. Holders Manchester City eventually finished second, after a short drop to fourth a few weeks before the final match.

Burnley were the first team to be relegated despite beating Hull City 1–0, while Queens Park Rangers suffered the same fate after a 6–0 demolition by Manchester City the next day. Hull City were the third and final team to be relegated after a draw against Manchester United on the final day of the season.

Manchester City's Sergio Agüero won the Golden Boot with 26 goals, with his teammate Joe Hart clinching a record fourth Golden Glove, having kept 14 clean sheets. Eden Hazard and José Mourinho were named as Player and Manager of the Season respectively.

Teams
Twenty teams competed in the league – the top seventeen teams from the previous season and the three teams promoted from the Championship. The promoted teams were Leicester City, Burnley and Queens Park Rangers, returning to the top flight after respective absences of ten years, four years and one year. They replaced Norwich City, Fulham and Cardiff City, ending their respective top-flight spells of three years, thirteen years and one year.

Stadiums and locations

Personnel and kits

Note: Flags indicate national team as has been defined under FIFA eligibility rules. Players may hold more than one non-FIFA nationality.

 Additionally, referee kits are made by Nike, sponsored by EA Sports, and Nike has a new match ball, the Ordem Premier League.

Managerial changes

League table

Results
On 3 May 2015, Chelsea beat Crystal Palace 1–0 to secure the Premier League title with three games to play. PFA Player of the Year winner Eden Hazard scored the winning goal near the end of the first half, heading in the rebound of his own penalty kick. The win left Chelsea 16 points ahead of Arsenal, which had five games remaining. Chelsea were atop the standings the entire year, having got off to a good start. For Chelsea, it was the fourth title in the last eleven years, but first in the last six seasons. It was the fifth title in the club's 110-year history. "We showed absolutely everything since day one, everything football demands from a team," said manager José Mourinho. "We had fantastic attacking football, we had fantastic domination ... we defended amazingly well." It was Mourinho's 22nd career title. He won titles at Chelsea in 2005 and 2006, before being forced out by owner Roman Abramovich, and returning in 2013. Diego Costa led Chelsea with 20 goals.

Season statistics

Scoring

Top scorers

Hat-tricks

4 Player scored 4 goals

Clean sheets

Discipline

Player
Most yellow cards: 14
 Lee Cattermole (Sunderland)
Most red cards: 2
 Tom Huddlestone (Hull City)
 Paul Konchesky (Leicester City)
 Kyle Naughton (Tottenham Hotspur)
 Moussa Sissoko (Newcastle United)
 Mike Williamson (Newcastle United)

Club
Most yellow cards: 94
Sunderland
Most red cards: 7
Aston Villa
Newcastle United

Awards

Monthly awards

Annual awards

References

External links
Official website
League and cup results for all the 2014/15 Premier Division clubs at footballsite

 
Eng
1
2014-15